Eagle Dynamics (often abbreviated as ED) is a software company originally founded by Nick Grey and Igor Tishin in 1991. Originally located in Moscow, Russia, it is now headquartered in Villars-sur-Glâne, Switzerland.

History 
Founded in 1991 by Nick Grey and Igor Tishin, the company teamed up with publisher Strategic Simulations (SSI) to produce its first game, a combat flight simulator. Released in November 1995, Su-27 Flanker offered players the opportunity to engage in combat aboard the eponymous aircraft over the Crimean peninsula.

Flanker 2.0 was released in 1999. Developers have incorporated better graphics, training missions, multiplayer, and the naval variant of the Su-27, the Sukhoi Su-33, into this release. The theater of operations remained limited to Crimea. Although graphically very accomplished, the game had a significant number of bugs.

Digital Combat Simulator was released in 2012 and made DCS: Black Shark and DCS: A-10C Warthog playable under a single platform. Since then, Eagle Dynamics has released many more "modules" (DLC) along with graphical and engine upgrades.

Controversies 

In 2019, one of the company's developers, Oleg Tishchenko, was extradited from Georgia to the United States on charges of illegally acquiring documentation for an F-16 fighter and smuggling its technical manuals to Moscow. In June 2019, Tishchenko returned home. He was sentenced by the Utah District Court to a term of 12 months and 1 day. But since the term of his conviction had already been served during the investigation period, after the trial, Oleg was released for immediate deportation from the United States.

Combat Flight Simulators 
Eagle Dynamics has developed a number of combat flight simulators beginning with Su-27 Flanker in 1995. DCS: Black Shark was the first simulator to feature a fully functional cockpit with a near-total simulation of all onboard systems including sensors, controls, and interfaces. It also launched under a new title, Digital Combat Simulator, which now incorporates all Eagle Dynamics products. DCS: World has also supported third-party products since Belsimtek released the UH-1H Huey.

Evolution of the Black Sea theater 
Since its first productions, Eagle Dynamics has systematically included a theater of operations located on the shores of the Black Sea. Its scope has evolved significantly over the company's publications.

References

Video game companies of Russia
Software companies of Russia
Companies based in Moscow
Combat flight simulators
Russian brands